Ali Shansuyi (also Romanized as ‘Alī Shānsūyī; also known as ‘Alī Shānslū’ī and ‘Alī Shānslū’ī-ye Bālā) is a village in Arshaq-e Markazi Rural District, Arshaq District, Meshgin Shahr County, Ardabil Province, Iran. At the 2006 census, its population was 41, in 11 families.

References 

Towns and villages in Meshgin Shahr County